Reuben "Ruby" Braff (March 16, 1927 – February 9, 2003) was an American jazz trumpeter and cornetist. Jack Teagarden was once asked about him on the Garry Moore television show and described Ruby as "the Ivy League Louis Armstrong".

Braff was born in Boston, Massachusetts, United States. He was renowned for working in an idiom ultimately derived from the playing of Louis Armstrong and Bix Beiderbecke. He began playing in local clubs in the 1940s. In 1949, he was hired to play with the Edmond Hall Orchestra at the Savoy Cafe of Boston. He relocated to New York in 1953 where he was much in demand for band dates and recordings.

He resided in Harwich, Massachusetts and died of complications from emphysema, heart failure, and glaucoma on February 9, 2003, in Chatham, Massachusetts. He had spent a good part of his life living in the Riverdale section of The Bronx, New York City.

Discography

As leader/co-leader
 Buck Meets Ruby (Vanguard, 1954) with Buck Clayton
 Jazz at Storyville, Vol. 1 and 2 (Savoy, 1955) with Pee Wee Russell
 Ruby Braff Swings (Bethlehem, 1955)
 Holiday in Braff (Bethlehem, 1955)
 Ball at Bethlehem with Braff (Bethlehem, 1955)
 Braff!! (Epic, 1956)
 Ruby Braff featuring Dave McKenna (ABC-Paramount, 1956)
 Hi-Fi Salute to Bunny  (RCA Victor, 1957)
 The Ruby Braff Octet with Pee Wee Russell & Bobby Henderson at Newport (Verve, 1957)
 Ruby Braff Goes 'Girl Crazy (Warner Bros. Records, 1958)
 Easy Now (RCA, 1959)
 You're Getting To Be A Habit With Me (Stere-O-Craft, 1959)
 Blowing Around The World (United Artists, 1959)
 The Ruby Braff Marshall Brown Sextet (United Artists, 1961)
 Live at the Regattabar (Arbors, 1993)
 Ruby Braff Remembers Louis Armstrong: Being with You (Arbors, 1997)
 You Can Depend on Me (Arbors, 1998)
 Born to Play (Arbors, 1999)
 Ruby Braff and Strings: In the Wee, Small Hours in London and New York (Arbors, 2000)
 The Cape Godfather (Arbors, 2000)
 Music for the Still of the Night (Arbors, 2001)
 I Hear Music (Arbors, 2002)
 Relaxing at the Penthouse with the John Pizzarelli Trio (Victoria, 2002)
 Variety Is the Spice of Braff (Arbors, 2002)
 Watch What Happens (Arbors, 2003)
 You Brought a New Kind of Love (Arbors, 2005)
 Controlled Nonchalance' at the Regattabar, Vol. 2 (Arbors, 2006)
 Ruby Braff And The Flying Pizzarellis: C'est Magnifique! (Arbors, 2007)
 Little Things - Live In Dublin 1976 (Nagel-Heyer Records, 2007)
 For the Last Time - Ruby Braff's Historic Final Performance With Scott Hamilton (Arbors, 2008)
 Our Love is Here to Stay (Arbors, 2010)

 With George Barnes
 The Ruby Braff-George Barnes Quartet (Chiaroscuro, 1974)
 The Ruby Braff-George Barnes Quartet Salutes Rodgers and Hart (Concord Jazz, 1974)
 The Ruby Braff-George Barnes Quartet – Live at the New School (Chiaroscuro, 1974)
 The Ruby Braff-George Barnes Quartet Plays Gershwin (Concord Jazz, 1974)
 The Ruby Braff-George Barnes Quartet – To Fred Astaire with Love (RCA, 1975)

 With Ellis Larkins
 2 Part Inventions in Jazz, Vol. 2, (Vanguard, 1955)
 The Grand Reunion (Chiaroscuro, 1972)
 Ruby Braff & Ellis Larkins: The Complete Duets (Definitive Classics, 2006)
 Ruby Braff and Ellis Larkins: Calling Berlin, Vols. 1 & 2 (Arbors)

As sidemanWith Larry AdlerLarry Adler Again! (Audio Fidelity, 1959)With Louis ArmstrongLouis Armstrong and His Friends (Flying Dutchman/Amsterdam, 1970)With Tony BennettTony Bennett Sings 10 Rodgers & Hart Songs (Improv, 1976)
Tony Bennett Sings More Great Rodgers & Hart (Improv, 1977)
Tony Bennett Sings the Rodgers & Hart Songbook (Concord, 2005; reissue of Improv recordings, plus unreleased takes)
With Buck Clayton
Jumpin' at the Woodside (Columbia, 1955)
All the Cats Join In (Columbia 1956)With Scott Hamilton and Dave McKennaControlled Nonchalance at the Regattabar, Volume 1 (Arbors)
Controlled Nonchalance, Volume 2 (Arbors)With Woody HermanIt Had To Be Us (Chiaroscuro 1998)With Milt HintonThe Judge at His Best (Chiaroscuro, 2001)With Dick HymanAmerica, The Beautiful (Arbors)
Ruby Braff and Dick Hyman Play Nice Tunes (Arbors)
Manhattan Jazz (MusicMasters)
Music from My Fair Lady (Concord)
Music from South Pacific (Concord)With Pee Wee RussellThe Individualism of Pee Wee Russell (1952)
A Portrait of Pee Wee (1958)With Ralph SuttonR & R (Chiaroscuro, 2002)
Remembered (Arbors DVD)With George Wein'''Wein, Women and Song and More, George Wein Plays and Sings (Arbors)George Wein & the Newport All-Stars (Impulse!, 1962)George Wein's Newport All-Stars'' (Atlantic, 1969)

See also
Izzy Ort's Bar & Grille

References

External links 
 Jazz Review biography
 
 

1927 births
2003 deaths
American jazz trumpeters
American male trumpeters
Candid Records artists
Dixieland revivalist trumpeters
Mainstream jazz trumpeters
Red Baron Records artists
Swing cornetists
Swing trumpeters
20th-century American musicians
20th-century trumpeters
20th-century American male musicians
21st-century American musicians
21st-century trumpeters
21st-century American male musicians
American male jazz musicians
Sackville Records artists
Black Lion Records artists
Arbors Records artists
RCA Records artists
United Artists Records artists
Chiaroscuro Records artists
Concord Records artists
Vanguard Records artists
Nagel-Heyer Records artists